The Heathcote-Graytown National Park is a national park located in the North Central region of Victoria, Australia.

The park lies within the Rushworth Box-Ironbark Region Important Bird Area, identified as such by BirdLife International because of its importance for swift parrots and other woodland birds.

It was primarily proclaimed to protect Victoria's diminishing box-ironbark forests, crucial in retaining Victoria's biodiversity.

See also

 Protected areas of Victoria

References

National parks of Victoria (Australia)
Protected areas established in 2002
2002 establishments in Australia
Important Bird Areas of Victoria (Australia)
Box-ironbark forest